Pacific Northwest English (also known, in American linguistics, as Northwest English) is a variety of North American English spoken in the U.S. states of Washington and Oregon, sometimes also including Idaho and the Canadian province of British Columbia. Due to the internal diversity within Pacific Northwest English, current studies remain inconclusive about whether it is best regarded as a dialect of its own, separate from Western American English or even California English or Standard Canadian English, with which it shares its major phonological features. The dialect region contains a highly diverse and mobile population, which is reflected in the historical and continuing development of the variety.

History
The linguistic traits that flourish throughout the Pacific Northwest attest to a culture that transcends boundaries. Historically, this hearkens back to the early years of colonial expansion by the British and Americans, when the entire region was considered a single area and people of all different mother tongues and nationalities used Chinook Jargon (along with English and French) to communicate with each other. Until the Oregon Treaty of 1846, it was identified as being either Oregon Country (by the Americans) or Columbia (by the British).

Linguists immediately after World WarII tended to find few patterns unique to the Western region, as among other things, Chinook Jargon and other "slang words" (despite Chinook Jargon being an actual separate language in and of itself, individual words from it like "salt chuck", "muckamuck", "siwash" and "tyee" were and still are used in Pacific Northwest English) were pushed away in favour of having a "proper, clean" dialect. Several decades later, linguists began noticing emerging characteristics of Pacific Northwest English, although it remains close to the standard American accent.

Phonology

Commonalities with both Canada and California
 Pacific Northwest English has all the phonological mergers typical of North American English and, more specifically, all the mergers typical of Western American English, including the cot–caught merger.
 Younger speakers of Pacific Northwest English also show features of the Canadian/California Vowel Shift, which moves front vowels through a lowering of the tongue:
  is backed and sometimes rounded to become . Most Pacific Northwest speakers have undergone the cot–caught merger. A notable exception occurs with some speakers born before roughly the end of World WarII. In addition, one study found that in Portland, Oregon, a distinction might still be made by some speakers, especially women.
 There are also conditional raising processes of open front vowels. These processes are often more extreme than in Canada and the North Central United States.
 Before the velar nasal ,  becomes . This change makes for minimal pairs such as rang and rain, both having the same vowel .
This is typical throughout the U.S.
While  raising is present in Canadian, Californian, and Pacific Northwest English, differences exist between the groups most commonly presenting these features.  Pre-nasal  raising is more prominent in Washingtonian speakers than in Canadian speakers.

Commonalities with Canada
These commonalities are shared with Canada and the North Central United States which includes the Minnesota accent.

  and, in the northern Pacific Northwest,  tend to become  before the voiced velar plosive : egg and leg are pronounced to rhyme with plague and vague. This feature is most frequently found in the areas north of Seattle, and is a feature shared by many northern Midwestern dialects and the Utah accent. In addition, sometimes bag will be pronounced bayg.
 While  raising is present in Canadian, Californian, and Pacific Northwest English, differences exist between the groups most commonly presenting these features.  raising is more common in younger Canadian speakers and less common in younger Washingtonian speakers.

Commonalities with California
 Back vowels of the California Shift: The Canadian/California Shift developing in Pacific Northwest English also includes these additional features only reminiscent of California English but not Canadian English (especially among working-class young-adult females):
 In speakers born around the 1960s, there is a tendency to move the tongue forward in the first element of the diphthong . This is reminiscent also of Midland, Mid-Atlantic, and Southern U.S. English.
 Absence of Canadian raising: For most speakers,  (though, in Seattle, not ) remains mostly lax before voiceless obstruents, although some variation has been reported. This likens the Pacific Northwest accent with Californian accents and contrasts it with Canadian (notably, though, most speakers from Vancouver, British Columbia, if included, do raise .)

Miscellaneous characteristics
 Some speakers perceive or produce the pairs  and  close to each other, for example, resulting in a merger between pen and pin, most notably for some speakers in Eugene, Oregon, and Spokane, Washington.

Lexicon
Several English terms originated in or are largely unique to the region:
 cougar: mountain lion
 duff: forest litter
 (high) muckamuck: an important person or person of authority, usually a pompous one (from Chinook Jargon, where it means "eats a lot; much food")
 potato bug: woodlouse 
 spendy: expensive
 sunbreak: a passage of sunlight in the clouds during dark, rainy weather (typical west of the Cascade Mountains)
tolo: Sadie Hawkins dance
spodie: An outdoor high school party in which attendees pay for and drink from a central container of mixed alcohol and sugary drinks. Generally limited to the Seattle area.

Variation among Mormons
In Cowlitz County, Washington, outside the Mormon culture region, there are very few phonological differences between the speech of Latter-day Saints (Mormons) and non-Mormons. This is in contrast to other studies finding some differences between Mormon and non-Mormon speech within the Mormon culture region.

See also
 California English
 Canadian English
 American English
 Chinook Jargon
 Chinook Jargon use by English Language speakers

Notes

References

Further reading
 Vowels and Consonants: An Introduction to the Sounds of Languages. Peter Ladefoged, 2003. Blackwell Publishing.
 Language in Society: An Introduction to Sociolinguistics. Suzanne Romaine, 2000. Oxford University Press.
 How We Talk: American Regional English Today. Allan Metcalf, 2000. Houghton Mifflin.

External links
 Hear Pacific Northwest English
 Phonological Atlas of North America

American English
Canadian English
English language in Canada
Culture of the Pacific Northwest
Languages of Canada